Frank Heath may refer to:
Sir Frank Heath (educationist) (1863–1946), British educationist and civil servant
Frank Heath (architect) (1907–1980), Australian architect and town planner